ALAS (Advanced Light Attack System) is a Serbian long-range multipurpose wire guided missile system developed by the private company EdePro and the state-owned Yugoimport SDPR. The ALAS missile system was developed primarily for missions against tanks, armored vehicles, fortifications, command posts, low-flying helicopters, coastal ships, industrial facilities and bridges. It can be deployed by any suitable platform including helicopters, armored vehicles, small ships and infantry. The guidance system is based on video/infrared technology, with the missile connected to the launcher by a fiber-optic cable. The ALAS flies at low altitude and has small radar and infrared (heat) signatures due to using a turbofan motor instead of a turbojet.  In recent years, the ALAS platform has found a secondary use as a UAV.

Description of system and role

The ALAS missile system is intended for two primary missions:
 Striking isolated targets from light land vehicles and for anti-ship combat.
 Striking land-based targets from the sea. In this scenario, the missile is launched from a small ship or a helicopter.

Another possible application of the ALAS missile system would be to defend an airfield and conduct surgical strikes until heavier forces are available. Its range could extend the close-combat kill zone to 5–25 km in front of the forward line of its own troops and for deeper strikes up to 60 km.

The operative flight envelope (required for flight and control system) in the radial axis with respect to the axis of motion is ±3g, whereas in the axial direction it is 10g.

Tactical role
The ALAS missile system is intended to attack distant targets, such as:
Static land installations
Tanks and combat vehicles
Hardened targets larger than 5 by 5 meters
Small boats, ships and other coastal targets

Variants

The two main types of system depend on missiles used as ALAS or RALAS system.

ALAS
The ALAS missile is hot-launched from its canister by means of a solid-propellant boost motor. ALAS is the designation for missiles produced in ALAS-A, ALAS-B and ALAS-C variants. 
ALAS-A is a surface to surface variant with range of 25 km.
ALAS-B is a surface to surface variant with range of 60 km.
ALAS-C (Coastal Defence)  is an anti-ship variant that is in mutual development between Serbia and UAE with 25 km or 50 km range in future development.

For the United Arab Emirates it will be delivered on the Nimr 6x6 chassis. The ALAS-C abandoned the initial design and moved the arrow wing forward.  It used a small degree of aerodynamic control via rudders and was propelled by an axial turbine engine equipped with a single nozzle. ALAS-C missiles installed the turbojet in the stretch LORANA of missile X-type wing control of the rudder, head mounted as a 45 ° cross. Located in the wing are the engine's two intake ports, the rear portion of the wing on both sides of the elastomer contains two, flat, engine nozzles and a fiber spool. Employing an INS or optionally a GPS guidance system, the ALAS-C will have a range of up to 25 km, using a video/CCS/IIR system to deliver its fragmentation warhead.

ALAS-A
Speed: 180 m/s (mid-course)
Altitude: 150-500m
Range: 25 km 
Penetration: 800mm RHA

Guidance
The missile is programmed to follow a preset course around or over any obstructing terrain using electronic terrain maps. the terminal guidance phase uses an infrared image making it possible to transfer thermal images back to the launching platform via a 200 MBit/s data link provided by an optical fibre. Thus, it is possible to manually select a target or abort the mission.

Missile communication is realized via optical monomode cable with two channels (communication directions):
Image transmission and data from missile to ground.
Data transmission from ground station to vehicle.
Firing station comprises a high-performance compact computer for missile guidance, an operator control panel and a high-resolution display. The system uses advanced control and image processing algorithms, electro-optical converters and radio links. The firing station has an optional GPS and north-seeking device. The firing station is used for mission planning before the engagement. The firing station stores a digitized map and displays the map during missile flight. For some applications, a dual monitor system is used. The firing unit can be used as a trainer and simulator without additional hardware.

When attacking ships, missiles can fly at an altitude of a few meters above sea level. At this stage of the flight, the flight controls are made according to pre-programmed data. When the rocket reaches the target area, the gunner seizes control.

Propulsion
During launch, a solid propellant booster accelerates the missile to an initial cruising speed  (120–150 m/s). Then the TMM-040 turbojet ignites to take the missile to the target under control of the guidance system and the operator. Main propulsion characteristics:
Missile main engine is a Mongoose 040 turbojet that permits a sub-sonic top speed of around 640–740 km/h (340-400 mph).
In launch phase uses two assigned propellant boosters.
Solid propellant booster is positioned on the rear side on the missile body placed after turbojet engine with requirements that thrust vector direction going through missile center of gravity position.

RALAS
RALAS (Rocketized Alas) has solid propellant sustainer rocket engine, accelerated with solid propellant booster engine variant can replace the turbojet with range estimated to 9–10 km with greater speed. It was in early stages of development designated as LORANA (LOng RAnge Non line of sight Attack system).  RALAS has a 10.5 kg tandem warhead capable to penetrate over 1,000 mm RHA, or a blast fragmentation one with a 25 meters lethal radius. RALAS is intended for use from land or helicopter platforms for launch. RALAS(LORANA) missile seeker was tested in mid 2012 on light aircraft SILA 450C domestic aircraft (made in Kraljevo, Serbia by Aero-East-Europe) in a series of 10 flights above "Pasuljanske livade" military multibranch exercise range. RALAS is an advanced remote non-line of sight attack system battery that consists of a battery command post (based on light wheeled armored SUV or semi) and four launch vehicles, with each vehicle equipped with 4 to 8 containers with missiles. A missile carrier is available for reloading missiles or as a backup control car.

RALAS missile consists of the following functional units/sub-systems:
Guidance head with a gyro-stabilized TV camera or Infrared seeker that uses either a contrast or a correlation algorithm
Subsystem management and control: warhead anti-tank tandem with 1 meter penetration of rolled, homogeneous armor steel
Group fired solid fuel propellant formed starting rocket engine and flight rocket engine (both engines developed by EDePro company)
Communication subsystem based on fiber optic cable connection to transfer real-time (part of communication sub system are roll with fiber optic cable with a length of 9 km)
Electronic transmission apparatus for laser video signal to digital signal receiver

Specification 
Length: 1.8 meters
Diameter: 175 mm 
Wingspan: 1.2 m 
Base weight: 60 kg
Warhead weight: 10.5 kg
Rocket motor thrust is 4500 Newtons: burn time is 3.5 seconds
Missile flight speed: 120–200 m/s
The rocket engine uses two laterally inclined nozzles with 300 N thrust and maximum specific impulse of 14 000 N

Guidance
The nose missile is mounted with a video unit that allows target detection the size of a tank at distances of 3 km. The field of view available on the display unit is 7 ° x 5 °. The fiber optic cable can handle pulling forces of 52 N. Loss of signal in an optical cable is 0.2 dB / km. The cable provides an on-board missile data transmission rate of 128 kbit/s and from the missile to ground control data transmission speed of 240 Mbi /s - available on one video channel and two data channels.

The firing station works similarly to ALAS.  RALAS(LORANA) can achieve a maximum deviation of 1 m.

Operational use
Missile takes off from the shipping container-starter.

RALAS(LORANA) can be stored in a container more than 10 years without maintenance. After the installation on the carrier the rocket is ready for immediate use.

Launching platform
RALAS is planned to be integrated on two mobile platforms:
Lazar 3
M18 Oganj
ALAS is planned to be integrated on:
Nimr 6x6
M18 Oganj
Premax-39

Operators

Current operators
 : contract reported in IDEX2013 military fair for ALAS-C based on 6x6 Nimr vehicle with 8 canisters for missiles. After completion of missile (within one year of signing contract) first completed and operational system prototype on Nimr 6x6 is to be delivered for testing.

Potential operators

See also
AFT-10 Missile Carrier
FOG-MPM
MGM-157 EFOGM
XM501 Non-Line-of-Sight Launch System
Polyphem
Type 96 Multi-Purpose Missile System

References 

Anti-tank guided missiles of Serbia
Surface-to-surface missiles
Serbian inventions